Gambling in Souls is a 1919 American silent crime drama film directed by Harry F. Millarde and starring Madlaine Traverse, Herbert Heyes, Murdock MacQuarrie, Lew Zehring, Mary McIvor, and Henry A. Barrows. The film was released by Fox Film Corporation on March 9, 1919.

Plot

Cast
Madlaine Traverse as Marcia Dunning, aka Madame Rouge
Herbert Heyes as 'Duke' Charters
Murdock MacQuarrie as Thomas Philborn
Lew Zehring as Dick Philborn
Mary McIvor as Edith Dunning
Henry A. Barrows as Latimer (as Henry Barrows)
Marian Skinner as Mrs. Caldwell (as Marion Skinner)
William Clifford as Robert Dunning

Preservation
The film is now considered lost.

See also
List of lost films
1937 Fox vault fire

References

External links

1919 crime drama films
American crime drama films
1919 films
American silent feature films
American black-and-white films
Fox Film films
Lost American films
1919 lost films
Films directed by Harry F. Millarde
1910s American films
Silent American drama films